Siegfried Wild was an Austrian luger who competed in the early 1970s. A natural track luger, he won two medals in the men's doubles event at the FIL European Luge Natural Track Championships with a gold in 1974 and bronze in 1971.

References

Austrian male lugers
Possibly living people
Year of birth missing